Euxoa conspicua is a moth of the family Noctuidae. It is found in Portugal, Spain, Andorra, France, Italy, Corsica, Crete, Cyprus, Romania, Bulgaria, Greece, Ukraine and southern and eastern Russia, east to China and northern India. It is also present in the Levant.

Description
Warren states E. conspicua Hbn. (= agricola Boisd., lycarum H.-Sch., squalida Ev.) (6h). Forewing luteous grey, dusted and shaded with fuscous, the dark and light shades contrasting; the lines double; the median shade distinct; claviform stigma with black outline; orbicular and reniform large, generally conspicuously pale, or with pale outlines; cell fuscous; hindwing dull grey with the base whitish; in Europe restricted to the South, occurring in the Canaries, Spain, France, Greece and S. Russia, and widely distributed through
West and Central Asia; in the ab. abscondita nom. nov. (= abdita Stgr. nec Joan.) (6i) the markings are all obscured by a luteous grey suffusion.
.

Biology
Adults are on wing from June to July. There is one generation per year.

References

External links
Fauna Europaea

Euxoa
Moths of Europe
Moths of Asia
Moths of the Middle East
Moths described in 1827